At the 1997 East Asian Games, the athletics events were held at the Busan Gudeok Stadium in Busan, South Korea between 10 and 19 May. Forty-three events were contested, 23 by male athletes and 20 by females.

In terms of country performance the competition was a closely contested affair between Japan, which dominated the men's events, and China which led in the women's proceedings. Both finished with a total of 16 gold medals, but China's strength in depth showed in the minor medals as it took a medal haul of 52 (ten more than Japan). Kazakhstan took the third-most gold medals with seven, while the hosts (South Korea) won 18 medals to be the third-best medalling team, although this was one of their weaker sports.

In terms of athletes, Minori Hayakari provided a boost to Japan by winning silver in the 800 metres and a bronze in the 1500 metres event. Wang Zhicheng of China also won two individual medals: a 5000 metres silver, and 10,000 metres bronze. A number of athletes went on to further success at the 1998 Asian Games: Koji Ito and Koji Murofushi won gold in their events, and China had particular success with their field eventers as Ren Ruiping, Li Meisu and Li Shaojie all took Asian Games gold medals.

Medal summary

Men

Women

Medal table

References

External links
Official website from Olympic Council of Asia

1997 East Asian Games
1997
East Asian Games
1997 East Asian Games